Jorge Fernandes may refer to:
Jorge Fernandes (swimmer), Brazilian Olympic swimmer
Silas (Portuguese footballer), full name Jorge Fernandes
Joca (footballer, born 1996) (Jorge Samuel Figueiredo Fernandes), Portuguese footballer
Jorge Fernandes (footballer, born 1997), Portuguese footballer
George Fernandes, political activist and journalist
Jotamont (Jorge Fernandes Monteiro, 1912–1988), Caper Verdean musician

See also
Jorge Fernández (disambiguation)